María Eugenia Rojas (born 27 December 1977) is a Peruvian former professional tennis player.

Rojas competed on the professional tour in the 1990s and reached a best singles ranking of 504 in the world. Between 1995 and 1998, Rojas represented the Peru Fed Cup team in a total of 13 ties, winning six singles and five doubles matches. Her only professional title came in 1998, when she partnered with Uruguay's Elena Juricich to win an ITF doubles tournament in Nuevo Laredo.

ITF finals

Doubles: 8 (1–7)

References

External links
 
 
 

1977 births
Living people
Peruvian female tennis players
20th-century Peruvian women
21st-century Peruvian women